Garry Anthony Moore  (born 8 January 1951) is a former mayor of Christchurch, New Zealand, serving from 1998 to 2007. Subsequently, he was a board member of the NZ Transport Agency. He is a 'South Island enthusiast'.

Early life
Moore was born in Palmerston North in 1951 and received his schooling there. He trained as an accountant; first at Palmerston North Technical Institute and then at Christchurch Polytechnic Institute of Technology. He had come to Christchurch through his love for vintage cars; the Vintage Car Club was founded in the city and rural roads around Christchurch are ideal for excursions in old cars. He met his wife, Pam Sharpe, while they were both studying at Christchurch Polytechnic. They were married in 1977 and have two girls and two boys. In the 1980s, he was involved in several schemes helping unemployed people. Whale Watch Ltd in Kaikoura is one such company that he helped set up.

Political career

In 1989, Moore was elected to the Area Health Board, which can be seen as early predecessors of the District Health Boards. Starting in 1992, he served two terms as councillor, before he was elected mayor in the 1998 local body elections. He announced that he would not stand for re-election in the 2007 local body elections. Former television host Bob Parker succeeded Moore as mayor of Christchurch in October 2007.

Post politics
In 2008 Moore was appointed a board member of the newly amalgamated NZ Transport Agency. Post-earthquake, Moore was a strong critic of the government agency Canterbury Earthquake Recovery Authority.

Honours and awards
In 1990, Moore was awarded the New Zealand 1990 Commemoration Medal. In the 2008 New Year Honours, he was appointed a Companion of the New Zealand Order of Merit, for services to local-body affairs.

See also
2001 Christchurch mayoral election
2004 Christchurch mayoral election

References

1951 births
Living people

Companions of the New Zealand Order of Merit

Mayors of Christchurch

New Zealand accountants
Christchurch City Councillors
Universal College of Learning alumni